Al-Ahli Club also known as Al Ahli Khartoum is an association football club from Khartoum, Sudan. They play in the top level of Sudanese professional football, the Sudan Premier League. Their home stadium is Khartoum Stadium.

Honours
Sudan Cup 
Runner-up (1): 2021-22

Performance in CAF Competition

CAF Confederation Cup
CAF Confederation Cup (1) appearance

CAF Cup 
CAF Cup (1) appearance

Player

External links
 Official website

Football clubs in Sudan
1929 establishments in Sudan